Zane Maloney (born 2 October 2003) is a Barbadian racing driver who is currently competing in the 2023 FIA Formula 2 Championship for Carlin. He was the 2019 British F4 champion and finished as runner-up in the 2022 FIA Formula 3 Championship, racing for Trident. In December 2022, it was announced he was joining the Red Bull Junior Team and will be a reserve driver for the Red Bull team in 2023.

Career

Karting 
Maloney started racing in North America at the age of 12 and after multiple karting titles in Barbados and America he soon moved over to Europe to compete for Ricky Flynn Motorsport. Maloney placed 4th in the Karting European Championship, 5th in the World Championships and 3rd in the German Championship and WSK Champions Cup respectively in 2018.

Lower formulas 
Maloney's first single seater season was in 2019 in the British F4 championship for Carlin Motorsport. Maloney won 10 races and ended up on the podium 15 times, he became the first driver since Jamie Caroline to win all three races in a single weekend, at Oulton Park. Maloney won the championship by 20 points over Mexican Sebastián Álvarez at the final round of the season. Through that he became the first Barbadian racing driver to win a championship in Europe, and the first rookie to win the championship outright in the history of the series.

Radical Caribbean Cup 
Maloney contested the final two rounds of the 2019 Radical Caribbean Cup, winning all three races at Bushy Park Barbados, and two races at South Dakota in Guyana. He returned for the first round of the 2020 season, but the year did not constitute as a championship after being cancelled after round 1 due to coronavirus. 

Maloney returned to the championship for the Frankie Boodram Wallerfield International Raceway round in Trinidad and Tobago in the 2022 season as a guest driver.

Euroformula Open Championship 
In January 2020, Maloney reunited with Carlin to contest the 2020 season. He scored his debut podium in the second race of the season at the Hungaroring, having finished 4th the day before. His next podium came at the Circuit Paul Ricard, but unfortunately for Maloney, this would end up being his final podium finish of the season. After scoreless rounds in Spielberg and Spa the Barbadian finished the season eighth in the drivers' standings, one position and point behind teammate Ido Cohen.

Formula Regional European Championship 

In December 2020, Maloney was signed to R-ace GP to contest the 2021 season. His first podium came at the second race of the first round in Imola, where he finished third. Following two ninth-place finishes in Barcelona, Maloney had an impressive round in Monaco: the Bajan finished second in the first race, and then won the second race from pole position, thus becoming the first Caribbean driver to be victorious in the Principality.

FIA Formula 3 Championship 

In November 2021 Maloney took part in the FIA Formula 3 post-season test, driving for reigning team champions Trident. In January the following year, the Italian outfit confirmed Maloney would race with them for the 2022 season. The Bajan proved to be competitive right away by taking pole position in rainy conditions at Imola, although a spin at the safety car restart cost him the chance of achieving victory. He scored his first podium in the second race at the Hungaroring, finishing second, whilst a first win followed in the subsequent round at Spa-Francorchamps, where he recovered from a high-speed collision with Oliver Goethe during the sprint race, which had caused the Trident driver's car to roll over. Maloney continued with the positive momentum, winning the Zandvoort feature race, having started from pole position. After scoring another pole at the season finale in Monza, Maloney fended off Ollie Bearman in a battle for the victory, which would be awarded to the former following a red flag. Maloney ended up second in the drivers' standings, missing out on the championship by five points to Victor Martins.

FIA Formula 2 Championship

2022 
Following Calan Williams' departure from the team, Maloney was called up to replace him at Trident for the Yas Marina season finale. After an uneventful weekend, Maloney was invited to test for Carlin at the end of season F2 test.

2023 
On 18th January 2023, Maloney was announced as a part of the team line-up for Rodin Carlin for 2023 season, alongside Brazilian driver and fellow Red Bull Junior Enzo Fittipaldi. Maloney qualified a poor 18th in the Bahrain opening round, but narrowly missed points in ninth during the sprint. A sprinting feature race charge followed, benefitting from lap 1 chaos and fresher tyres to claim third place and his first F2 podium. Following the race, Maloney stated that "the engine shut off" mid-race momentarily.

Formula One 
In December 2022, Maloney joined the Red Bull Junior Team and is Red Bull Racing's reserve driver in 2023.

Personal life 
Maloney's uncle manages the Bushy Park Circuit in Barbados.

Karting record

Karting career summary

Complete CIK-FIA Karting European Championship results 
(key) (Races in bold indicate pole position) (Races in italics indicate fastest lap)

Complete Karting World Championship results

Racing record

Racing career summary 

† As Maloney was a guest driver, he was ineligible to score points.

Complete F4 British Championship results 
(key) (Races in bold indicate pole position) (Races in italics indicate fastest lap)

Complete Euroformula Open Championship results 
(key) (Races in bold indicate pole position) (Races in italics indicate fastest lap)

Complete Formula Regional European Championship results 
(key) (Races in bold indicate pole position) (Races in italics indicate fastest lap)

Complete FIA Formula 3 Championship results 
(key) (Races in bold indicate pole position) (Races in italics indicate points for the fastest lap of top ten finishers)

Complete FIA Formula 2 Championship results 
(key) (Races in bold indicate pole position) (Races in italics indicate points for the fastest lap of top ten finishers)

* Season still in progress.

References

External links 
 
 

2003 births
Living people
Barbadian racing drivers
Euroformula Open Championship drivers
Formula Regional European Championship drivers
Carlin racing drivers
R-ace GP drivers
Trident Racing drivers
British F4 Championship drivers
FIA Formula 3 Championship drivers
Karting World Championship drivers
FIA Formula 2 Championship drivers